"Time and Again" is the fourth episode of the science fiction television series Star Trek: Voyager. The episode first aired on January 30, 1995 on the UPN television network.

Starship Voyager commanded by Captain Janeway is hit by a shock wave come from a nearby solar system, and goes to investigate. On arrival they beam down an away team to a planet's surface where the wave originated.

This episode aired on the United Paramount Network (UPN) on January 30, 1995.

Production 
Scenes in this episode were filmed at Tillman Water Reclamation Plant in California, which has been a popular shooting location for the Star Trek franchise.

Plot
While Lt Tom Paris is peer-pressuring Ensign Harry Kim to go on a date with the Delaney sisters from stellar cartography, Voyager is hit by a "polaric" detonation from a nearby planet. On arrival, they find the planet's population has been completely wiped out. An away team, including Captain Kathryn Janeway and Lieutenant Tom Paris, transport to the surface and estimate from the ruins that the explosion only happened a day earlier. Signs of temporal anomalies have been left in its wake. Janeway and Paris become caught in one, finding themselves on the planet the day before the explosion. Quickly integrating themselves into the general population, they learn that the planet's civilization is powered by a volatile form of energy known as "polaric" energy, an option that has been met with some protest. Janeway and Paris become caught up with a group of saboteurs threatening to compromise one of the polaric power plants. Janeway and Paris's strange Starfleet equipment prompt the saboteurs to believe they are infiltrators, so they confiscate the equipment, bring forward their sabotage plan and force Janeway and Paris to accompany them to the power plant.

Meanwhile, a day in the future, Kes's nascent psychic ability allows her to identify that Janeway and Paris have fallen back into the past. The remaining senior Voyager officers develop a method to create a short-lived rift to the past through which they hope to evacuate Janeway and Paris.

The saboteurs use Janeway and Paris as a diversion to allow them access to the polaric plant, during which Paris is shot and wounded. As they begin their sabotage, the Voyager crew initiates the rift. Janeway recognizes that it is the rift which, if not closed, will trigger the detonation that kills all life on the planet. The saboteurs allow Janeway to use her phaser to force the rift to close, changing the future.

Events then return to the start of the episode: Voyager detects the nearby planet, bustling with a pre-warp civilization using polaric energy. Kes appears on the bridge, concerned about a feeling of deja vu, but is relieved to see the planet's civilization is alive and well. In accordance with the Prime Directive, Voyager refrains from communicating with it and continues on its journey home.

Reception
Reviewers Lance Parkin and Mark Jones noted with disappointment the similarity between this episode and the previous one, "Parallax", which also relies heavily on technobabble and involves a similar situation: a temporal anomaly in which the crew are trapped and for which they are themselves unwittingly responsible.

Den of Geek noted "Time and Again" for its time travel plot and described it as "..by the numbers but perfectly serviceable.."

In 2017, Netflix announced that "Time and Again" was among the top ten most re-watched Star Trek episodes, excluding the first two episodes of each series. Den of Geek suggested "Time and Again" for a binge-watching guide that focused on Star Trek: Voyager episodes featuring time travel.

In 2019, Higgy Pop noted this episode as one of the time travel stories of the Star Trek franchise.

In 2020, Tor.com gave this a 5 out 10.

In 2021, one reviewer for Screen Rant was overall positive about the orange striped outfits, but was uncomfortable with so many characters wearing it, remarking "when everyone on the entire planet wears the same exact striped, orange shirts? That gets weird." and suggested a greater variety of costumes."

References

External links

 

Star Trek: Voyager (season 1) episodes
1995 American television episodes
Star Trek time travel episodes
Television episodes directed by Les Landau